Carlos Eduardo Ferreira Batista (born 6 October 1992 in Vizela, Braga District), known as Káká, is a Portuguese professional footballer who plays for U.D. Leiria as a left-back.

References

External links

1992 births
Living people
People from Vizela
Sportspeople from Braga District
Portuguese footballers
Association football defenders
Primeira Liga players
Liga Portugal 2 players
Segunda Divisão players
F.C. Vizela players
Vitória S.C. B players
Vitória S.C. players
C.F. Os Belenenses players
U.D. Oliveirense players
U.D. Leiria players
S.C. Olhanense players
Portugal under-21 international footballers